Legoland Water Park refers to a water park that is adjacent to a Legoland theme park.

Places
 Lego Land Water Park, California in Legoland California
 Lego Land Water Park, Florida in Legoland Florida Resort
 Lego Land Water Park, Italy in Gardaland Resort

Legoland